Pan-American, Pan American, Panamerican, Pan-America, Pan America or Panamerica may refer to:

 Collectively, the Americas: North America, Central America, South America and the Caribbean
 Something of, from, or related to the Americas
 Pan-Americanism, an integrationist movement among the nations of the Americas
 Pan American Union, later the Organization of American States
 Pan Am, a former international airline carrier based in the United States.
 Pan American (band), an ambient/post-rock music ensemble
 Pan-American (train), a L&N train that ran from Cincinnati to New Orleans
 , a steamship

See also
 
 
 
 Pan American Band Instrument Company
 Pan-American Car, by Packard
 Pan American Center, in New Mexico, United States
 Pan American Championship (disambiguation)
 Pan American Christian Academy, in São Paulo, Brazil
 Pan-American Exposition, Buffalo, New York, United States, 1901
 Pan American Games
 Pan American Health Organization
 Pan-American Highway
 Panamerican Karate Federation
 Pan American Petroleum and Transport Company, former oil company merged into Amoco
 Pan American Silver Corporation, a Canadian mining company
 Pan American (Hank Williams song)
 American (disambiguation)
 Pan Am (disambiguation)